Athanasios Giannopoulos (born 12 June 1947) is a Greek boxer. He competed in the men's middleweight event at the 1972 Summer Olympics. At the 1972 Summer Olympics, he lost in his first fight to Nazif Kuran of Turkey.

References

External links
 

1947 births
Living people
Greek male boxers
Olympic boxers of Greece
Boxers at the 1972 Summer Olympics
Place of birth missing (living people)
Mediterranean Games bronze medalists for Greece
Mediterranean Games medalists in boxing
Competitors at the 1971 Mediterranean Games
Middleweight boxers
20th-century Greek people